Roy Lee Ray  (born July 16, 1939) was a member of the Ohio Senate, serving the 27th district from 1987 to 2001. His district encompassed portions of Akron. In 2001, he resigned and was succeeded by Kevin Coughlin. Ray served as Mayor of Akron from 1980 to 1983.

Ray successfully pushed for a change to the Seal of Ohio that reduced the number of rays from 17 to 13.

References

External links
U of Akron Archives: Roy L. Ray
Roy Ray leaves CSU for University of Akron
Hidden Agendas: Roy Ray

Republican Party Ohio state senators
Living people
1939 births
Mayors of Akron, Ohio
University of Akron alumni
21st-century American politicians